Sapphira and the Slave Girl is Willa Cather's last novel, published in 1940.  It is the story of Sapphira Dodderidge Colbert, a bitter white woman, who becomes irrationally jealous of Nancy, a beautiful young slave.  The book balances an atmospheric portrait of antebellum Virginia against an unblinking view of the lives of Sapphira's slaves.

Plot summary 
Except for the epilogue, the book takes place entirely in 1856.

Sapphira Colbert is an unhappy middle-aged woman, crippled by dropsy, who came to marriage late and married beneath her station.  Her husband, Henry, a miller, lives an entirely separate life, residing at his mill and visiting the estate house only for occasional meals.  Sapphira is comfortable with slavery; Henry is not.

Having overheard a conversation between two of her slaves, Sapphira develops a paranoid fear that Henry is having an affair with an attractive young mulatto girl named Nancy.  Sapphira responds by mistreating Nancy.  Eventually Sapphira invites a dissolute nephew to the estate, who threatens to rape Nancy on several occasions.

With the help of the Colberts' daughter, Rachel Colbert Blake, and two abolitionist neighbors, Nancy is helped to make connections with the Underground Railroad and taken to Canada.

The epilogue takes place 25 years later.  Nancy, now in her 40s, returns to Virginia to visit her mother, and Mrs. Blake. The narrator (Cather) is revealed to be a child who has heard stories of Nancy's escape all of her life.

Characters 

Sapphira Dodderidge Colbert, a middle-aged white woman, dying of dropsy.  Having married at the late age of 24, she has accepted as her husband a man she considers socially beneath her, and now this friction dominates the marriage.  She is an Episcopalian.  She has inherited her slaves from her father and believes thoroughly in the institution of slavery.
Henry Colbert, a middle-aged white man, a miller and a Lutheran.  He is tolerant of his bitter wife, but lives an essentially separate life, residing at his mill.  Henry has developed qualms about slavery, mostly on religious grounds, but believes that the Colbert slaves are his wife's property.
Rachel Colbert Blake, a white widow in her 30s who attends the Baptist church although she has not formally converted.  As a child, she was her mother's least favorite daughter, which caused her to seek out the company of a neighbor, Mrs. Bywaters, who was an abolitionist.  Rachel now also opposes slavery, and eventually aids Nancy in her escape.
Nancy, a mulatto slave in her late teens, the daughter of Till and a white man believed to be one of Henry Colbert's brothers or a Cuban painter who once stayed at the estate.  Her quiet ways make her Henry's favorite, which, along with overheard gossip, causes Sapphira to falsely assume that the two are having intimate relations.
Till, a black slave in her 40s or 50s.  She was orphaned as a child when her mother's dress caught fire, causing her death.  She was put in the care of Mrs. Meacham, a white woman who became her surrogate mother and teacher.  She was eventually sold to Sapphira as a lady's maid.  She has one daughter, Nancy, who is believed by the family to have been fathered by an itinerant Cuban artist with whom she had a relationship. Till was married off to Uncle Jeff, who has physical handicaps and is unable to have sexual relations, so that her value as a maid would not be impeded by pregnancy.
Fat Lizzie, a black slave and the household cook.  She is a gossip and the primary source of Nancy's troubles.  She is the mother of Bluebell, a Prissy-type slave on the estate.
Old Jezebel, the oldest slave on the estate, she came to America in the 1780s and dies half-way through the book.
Rev. Fairhead, a white Baptist minister and an abolitionist
Mrs. Bywaters, a white woman, postmistress and an abolitionist
Martin Colbert, a white man and Henry's nephew.  A morally bankrupt man, whose amusing conversation charms Sapphira and annoys Henry.  He makes threatening advances towards Nancy, suggesting on multiple occasions that he intends to rape her.  He is the primary cause of her flight.  He later dies during the Civil War fighting for the Confederate cause.

Criticism 
The novel is discussed in Toni Morrison's Playing in the Dark--an adaptation of three lectures given by Morrison in 1990. Sapphira and the Slave Girl is discussed as an example of a white writer's imagining of black characters and the "powerful impact race has on narrative" (page 24).

Allusions to other works 

The Baptist church scene in Book II contains a long reference to William Billings' hymn, "There is a Land of Pure Delight".

References

External links 
 Encyclopedia.com
 Enotes.com
 Nebraska Press
 Encyclopedia Virginia
 Review, St. Joseph News Press, 8 Dec 1940
 Review, Meriden Record, Blanche Hixon Smith, 31 Jan 1941

1940 American novels
Fiction set in 1856
Novels by Willa Cather
Novels about American slavery
Southern United States in fiction
American historical novels
Novels set in Virginia
Alfred A. Knopf books